Ice sledge speed racing at the 1998 Winter Paralympics consisted of sixteen events, eight for men and eight for women.

Medal summary

Medal table

Men's events

Women's events

References 

 
IPC Historical Results Database - General Search, International Paralympic Committee (IPC)
 

1998 Winter Paralympics events
1998